Middle Musquodoboit is a rural community in the Musquodoboit Valley region of Nova Scotia, Canada within the Halifax Regional Municipality, along the Musquodoboit River at the junction of Route 357 with Route 224,  from Dartmouth, Nova Scotia. The community's name comes from the First Nations' word Mooskoduboogwek, which means to suddenly widen out after a narrow entrance at a mouth. For a time after 1883, Middle Musquodoboit was called Laytonville, but at some point reverted to its former name.

Amenities

There are numerous farms in the Middle Musquodoboit area. It, along with Upper Musquodoboit, are the major communities in the valley, being the two largest communities. Middle Musquodoboit has a bakery/restaurant, a fire station, a police station, a natural resources station, a post office, and an RBC bank. The annual Halifax County Exhibition is held each August in the community. There is a park along the Musquodoboit River 5 minutes outside Middle Musquodoboit, towards Upper Musquodoboit. Musquodoboit Valley Memorial Hospital (MVMH) is the only hospital in the Musquodoboit Valley. The facility is located on the opposite side of the Musquodoboit River. It is connected to Braeside Nursing Home, which is adjacent to the hospital.

Middle Musquodoboit boasts two schools: Musquodoboit Rural High School (MRHS) and Musquodoboit Valley Education Centre (MVEC).

MRHS is the only high school in the Musquodoboit Valley. It has two feeder schools, Musquodoboit Valley Education Centre and Upper Musquodoboit Consolidated School, located in Upper Musquodoboit. The school teaches grades seven through twelve. The school offers Intensive French. The school was constructed in 2008. As of 2017, there are 273 students enrolled in the school. Musquodoboit Valley Education Centre (MVEC) is a feeder school of MRHS. The school teaches grades primary through six. The school was constructed in 2001. As of 2017, there are 119 students enrolled in the school.

Transportation
Middle Musquodoboit is located at the junction of Route 357 with Route 224. The roads in the area are a mix of both paved and unpaved roads.

Climate

References

External links
Musquodoboit Valley Education Centre
Musquodoboit Rural High School
Simon Brown
Explore HRM

Communities in Halifax, Nova Scotia
General Service Areas in Nova Scotia